Screamo (also referred to as skramz) is an aggressive subgenre of emo that emerged in the early 1990s and emphasizes "willfully experimental dissonance and dynamics". San Diego-based bands Heroin and Antioch Arrow pioneered the genre in the early 1990s, and it was developed in the late 1990s mainly by bands from the East Coast of the United States such as Pg. 99, Orchid, Funeral Diner, Saetia, and I Hate Myself. Screamo is strongly influenced by hardcore punk and characterized by the use of screamed vocals. Lyrical themes usually include emotional pain, death, romance, and human rights. The term "screamo" has frequently been mistaken as referring to any music with screaming.

Screamo experienced popularity in the 2000s with the success of bands like Alesana, Thursday, Underoath, Silverstein, Hawthorne Heights, Alexisonfire, and Senses Fail. The genre's popularity declined in the 2010s but continued to have underground success with bands like La Dispute and Pianos Become the Teeth.

Terminology
While the genre was developing in the early 1990s, it was not initially called "screamo." Chris Taylor, lead vocalist for the band Pg. 99, said "we never liked that whole screamo thing. Even during our existence, we tried to venture away from the fashion and tell people, 'Hey, this is punk.'" Jonathan Dee of The New York Times wrote that the term "tends to bring a scornful laugh from the bands themselves." Lars Gotrich of NPR Music made the following comment on the matter in 2011:

In the 2000s the term "screamo" began being used loosely to describe any use of human vocal instrument growled-word vocals (commonly termed screamed vocals) in music. It has been applied to a wide variety of genres unrelated to the original screamo scene. Juan Gabe, vocalist for the band Comadre, alleged that the term "has been kind of tainted in a way, especially in the States." Derek Miller, guitarist for the band Poison the Well noted the term's constant differing usages and jokingly stated that it "describes a thousand different genres." Bert McCracken, lead singer of The Used, stated that screamo is merely a term "for record companies to sell records and for record stores to categorize them."

History

Origins (1990s)

Screamo arose as a distinct music genre in 1991 at the Ché Café in San Diego, developed by bands such as Heroin and Antioch Arrow. Gravity Records and Ebullition Records released this more chaotic and expressive descendant of emo. Other bands that helped develop early screamo on these labels came from Northern California, such as Portraits of Past from the San Francisco Bay Area and Mohinder from Cupertino. The scene is noted for its distinctive fashion sense inspired by the mod subculture. As with emo, the term screamo carries some controversy among participants.

Many groups from the East Coast were influential in the continual development and reinvention of the style during the late 90s and early 2000s, including Orchid, Pg. 99, Saetia, City of Caterpillar, Majority Rule, Jeromes Dream, Circle Takes the Square, Hot Cross, and Ampere.

Mainstream crossover (2000s)

By 1995, the term "screamo" drifted into the music press, especially in the journalism of Jim DeRogatis and Andy Greenwald, and by the mid-2000s, the term was being applied to many newer bands. Screamo bands such as The Used, Thrice, Finch, Thursday, and Silverstein developed a newer period of screamo in the 21st century. Thursday cited the post-punk band Joy Division, and the post-hardcore band Fugazi as important influences, but also took cues from the alternative rock styles of Radiohead, U2, and The Cure. Many of these bands took influence from bands like Refused and At the Drive-In. In contrast to the do-it-yourself screamo bands of the 1990s, screamo bands such as Thursday and The Used have signed multi-album contracts with labels such as Island Def Jam and Reprise Records. However, this style's connection to the genre has been disputed, with some referring to it as "MTV screamo" or "pop-screamo", and many bands more commonly being categorized as post-hardcore or metalcore. Alternative Press describes pop screamo as "metal-influenced riffs and aggressive, high-end screams filled song's verses, while soaring melodies carried choruses to new, previously unattained heights."
 
The term "post-screamo" has been used loosely to describe a wide variety of music in the 2000s and later that was influenced by traditional screamo. In a review of City of Caterpillar's influence on the genre, reporter Jason Heller of Vice writes "Call it post-screamo, if you must. Okay, maybe don't do that. But .... the early 00s weren't the end of an era or anything so corny. It was just a transition."

In the mid-2000s, the style of early screamo regained vitality, with American bands like Comadre, Off Minor, and Hot Cross releasing records on independent labels. The contemporary screamo scene has remained particularly active in Europe, with bands such as Amanda Woodward, Louise Cyphre, Le Pré Où Je Suis Mort, La Quiete, Daïtro, and Raein all being prime examples of their scene. Fluff Fest, held in Czechia since 2000, was in 2017 described by Bandcamp Daily  as a "summer ritual" for many fans of screamo in Europe.

Revival (2010s) 

In the early 2010s the term "screamo" began to be largely reclaimed by a new crop of do-it-yourself bands, with many screamo acts, like Loma Prieta, Pianos Become the Teeth, La Dispute, and Touché Amoré releasing records on fairly large independent labels such as Deathwish Inc. In 2011 Alternative Press noted that La Dispute is "at the forefront of a traditional-screamo revival" for their critically acclaimed release Wildlife. They are a part of a group of stylistically similar screamo-revival bands self-defined as "The Wave," made up of Touché Amoré, La Dispute, Defeater, Pianos Become the Teeth, and Make Do and Mend. As well as, California's Deafheaven, who formed in 2010, having been described as screamo, in a style similar to that of Envy. Alternative Press has cited a "pop screamo revival" along with this, with bands like Before Their Eyes, The Ongoing Concept, Too Close to Touch and I Am Terrified.

In August 2018, Noisey writer Dan Ozzi declared that it was the "Summer of Screamo" in a month-long series documenting screamo acts pushing the genre forward following the decline in popularity of "The Wave," as well as the reunions of seminal bands such as Pg. 99, Majority Rule, City of Caterpillar, and Jeromes Dream. Groups highlighted in this coverage, including Respire, Ostraca, Portrayal of Guilt, Soul Glo, I Hate Sex, and Infant Island, had generally received positive press from large publications, but were not as widely successful as their predecessors. Noisey also documented that, despite its loss of mainstream popularity and continued hold in North American scenes, particularly Richmond, Virginia, screamo had become a more international movement; notably spreading to Japan, France, and Sweden with groups including Heaven in Her Arms, Birds in Row, and Suffocate for Fuck Sake, respectively. Also in 2018, Vein released their debut album Errorzone to critical acclaim and commercial success, bringing together elements of screamo, hardcore, and nu metal. This underground cohort of acts was primarily released by independent labels like Middle-Man Records in the United States, Zegema Beach Records in Canada, and Miss The Stars Records in Berlin.

Characteristics
 

Screamo is a style of hardcore punk-influenced emo with screaming. Alex Henderson of AllMusic considers screamo a bridge between hardcore punk and emo. The term screamo is a portmanteau of the words "scream" and "emo." Screamo uses typical rock instrumentation, but is notable for its brief compositions, chaotic sounds, harmonized guitars, and screaming vocals. Screamo is characterized "by frequent shifts in tempo and dynamics and by tension-and-release catharses." Many screamo bands also incorporate ballads. According to AllMusic, screamo is "generally based in the aggressive side of the overarching punk-revival scene." Screamed vocals are used "not consistently, but as a kind of crescendo element, a sonic weapon to be trotted out when the music and lyrics reach a particular emotional pitch." Emotional singing and harsh screaming are common vocals in screamo.

Screamo lyrics often feature topics such as emotional pain, breakups, romantic interest, politics, and human rights. These lyrics are usually introspective, similar to that of softer emo bands. The New York Times noted that "part of the music's appeal is its un-self-conscious acceptance of differences, respect for otherness." Some screamo bands openly demonstrate acceptance of religious, nonreligious, and straight edge lifestyles

Many screamo bands in the 1990s saw themselves as implicitly political, and as a reaction against the turn to the right embodied by California politicians, such as Roger Hedgecock. Some groups were also unusually theoretical in inspiration: Angel Hair cited surrealist writers Antonin Artaud and Georges Bataille, and Orchid lyrically name-checked French new wave icon Anna Karina, German philosopher Friedrich Nietzsche, French philosopher Michel Foucault, and critical theory originators the Frankfurt School.

Subgenres and fusion genres

Emoviolence

Some screamo bands borrow the extreme dissonance, speed, and chaos of powerviolence. As a result, the term emoviolence was half-jokingly coined by the band In/Humanity to describe the fusion of the two styles which applied to themselves, as well as other bands including Pg. 99, Orchid, Reversal of Man, Usurp Synapse, and RentAmerica. Additionally, bands such as Orchid, Reversal of Man, and Circle Takes the Square tend to be much closer in style to grindcore than their forebears. In contemporary times, the genre is no longer as prevalent or widespread as it had been in the past, yet it still remains as a notable and prevalent force in underground screamo. A revival of the genre has occurred internationally with regional scenes in Southeast Asia and South America taking prominence.

Post-screamo
Bands including City of Caterpillar, Circle Takes the Square, Envy, Funeral Diner, Pianos Become the Teeth, Respire, and Le Pré Où Je Suis Mort have incorporated post-rock elements into their music. This fusion is characterized by abrupt changes in pace, atmospheric and harmonic instrumentation, and distorted vocals. Similarly, bands such as Heaven in Her Arms and the aforementioned group Envy, use elements of shoegazing.

Blackened screamo
Blackened screamo or blackened skramz melds black metal with screamo. Examples of blackened screamo bands include Celeste, Anomie, Bosse-de-Nage, No Omega, and We Came Out Like Tigers.

Sass
Sass (also known as sassy screamo, sasscore, white belt hardcore, white belt, sassgrind or dancey screamo) is a style that emerged from the late-1990s and early-2000s screamo scene. The genre incorporates elements of post-punk, new wave, disco, electronic, dance-punk,  grindcore, noise rock, metalcore, mathcore and beatdown hardcore. The genre is characterized by often incorporating overtly flamboyant mannerisms, erotic lyrical content, synthesizers, dance beats and a lisping vocal style. Sass bands include the Blood Brothers, An Albatross, The Number Twelve Looks Like You, the Plot to Blow Up the Eiffel Tower, early Daughters, later-Orchid and SeeYouSpaceCowboy.

Pop screamo
"Pop screamo" and "MTV screamo" are terms used to describe screamo influenced bands who use metallic instrumentation and pop song structure to form a more commercially viable sound than traditional screamo. The style developed and gained mainstream success in the early-2000s. The scene was led by bands such as Thursday, Hawthorne Heights, Taking Back Sunday, The Used, Senses Fail, Silverstein, Chiodos, From First to Last, Saosin, Thrice and Finch and now-defunct less-known bands such as Before Their Eyes, Here I Come Falling, Agraceful, Yesterdays Rising, Chasing Victory, Beloved, Dead Poetic, Burden of a Day and Sever Your Ties. The genre had a revival in the 2010s, including such outfits as Before Their Eyes, The Ongoing Concept, Too Close to Touch, I Am Terrified. Alternative Press describes pop screamo as "metal-influenced riffs and aggressive, high-end screams filled song's verses, while soaring melodies carried choruses to new, previously unattained heights." as well as "Poppy emo music with screaming in it that captured mainstream attention in the mid-2000s". Furthermore, many of these groups are more commonly categorized as, and influenced by, post-hardcore or metalcore.

See also
 List of screamo bands
 Post-hardcore
 Powerviolence
 Grindcore

References

 
Emo
1990s in music
Hardcore punk genres
American rock music genres
American styles of music
Youth culture in the United States